The 2021–22 Tunisian Women's Championship is the 16th season of the Tunisian Women's Championship, the Tunisian national women's association football competition. ASF Sousse are the defending champions.

Clubs

North Group
 AS Banque de l'Habitat
 ASF Sousse
 ASF Sahel
 US Tunisienne
 ASF Sbiba
 ASF Bou Hajla

South Group
 ASF Gafsa
 ASF Medenine
 MS Sidi Bouzid
 ASF Sbeitla
 PSF Sfax
 ES Tataouine

Group stage

Group A

Results

Group B

Results

Play Off 

1st 15 May 2022
AS Banque de l'Habitat 3-0  ASF Sahel
 MS Sidi Bouzid 3-1 ES Tataouine

2nd 18 MAy 2022
AS Banque de l'Habitat 2-0 ES Tataouine
 MS Sidi Bouzid 0-1   ASF Sahel

3rd:22 May 2022
AS Banque de l'Habitat    MS Sidi Bouzid 
ASF Sahel   ES Tataouine

References

External links
Women football - FTF official website

Tunisian Women's Championship